Ryne is a given name. Notable people with the given name include:

Ryne Duren (1929-2011), American baseball player
Ryne Harper (born 1989), American baseball player
Ryne Sanborn (born 1989), American architect
Ryne Sandberg (born 1959), American baseball player
Ryne Stanek (born 1991), American baseball player
Ryne Brown  (born 1985), American baseball umpire